José Alejandro Montano Guzmán (born 26 November 1956) is a Mexican politician affiliated with the PRI. From September 1, 2012, to August 31, 2015, he served as Deputy of the LXII Legislature of the Mexican Congress representing Veracruz.

References

1956 births
Living people
Politicians from Veracruz
Institutional Revolutionary Party politicians
21st-century Mexican politicians
Deputies of the LXII Legislature of Mexico
Members of the Chamber of Deputies (Mexico) for Veracruz